Nana 10, previously Nana (lit. mint), was an Israeli Web portal. The website was owned by Israeli web and communication company 013 Netvision, and Israeli news Channel 10, and consisted of Internet forums, which it was especially known for, news, culture sections, an Internet magazine and more. The site was closed after the channel's move to their new website, 10.TV.

See also
Hadashot 10 (The TV company providing the news for "nana 10" portal)

References

External links

Nana 10 website 

Online companies of Israel
Israeli news websites
Israeli brands
Mass media in Givatayim
Channel 10 (Israeli TV channel)